Merry E. Wiesner-Hanks is an American historian and Distinguished Professor Emerita at the University of Wisconsin–Milwaukee's Department of History. She describes herself as wearing "... two hats, one as a historian of early modern Europe and the other as a world/global historian, with a primary focus on women, gender, and sexuality within these".

She is editor-in-chief of the seven-volume 2015 Cambridge World History, and co-editor of three of its parts: Volume 5: Expanding Webs of Exchange and Conflict, 500CE–1500CE with Benjamin Z. Kedar and Volume 6: The Construction of a Global World, 1400–1800 CE, Part 1: Foundations and Part 2: Patterns of Change with Jerry H. Bentley and Sanjay Subrahmanyam.

She holds a Ph.D. from the University of Wisconsin–Madison, and before moving to the University of Wisconsin she was an assistant professor at Augustana College, Rock Island, Illinois, from 1979 to 1985.

Wiesner-Hanks is a senior editor of The Sixteenth Century Journal: The Journal of Early Modern Studies, and an editor of the Journal of Global History.

Her books include Women and Gender in Early Modern Europe; Gender in History: Global Perspectives; Early Modern Europe, 1450–1789; and A Concise History of the World. Wiesner-Hanks also contributed to the textbook A History of Western Society with John P. McKay, which has been published in several editions and is often used in Advanced Placement European History classes.

References

Further reading

Women and Gender in Early Modern Europe (3rd ed. 2008, Cambridge)
Gender in History: Global Perspectives (2nd ed, 2010, Wiley-Blackwell)
Early Modern Europe, 1450–1789 (2nd ed, 2013, Cambridge UP)
A Concise History of the World (2015, Cambridge UP)

External links

Year of birth missing (living people)
Living people
American women historians
University of Wisconsin–Milwaukee faculty
Augustana College (Illinois) faculty
University of Wisconsin–Madison alumni
Place of birth missing (living people)
Presidents of the World History Association